Lischke is a surname. Notable people with the surname include:

Karl Emil Lischke (1819–1886), German lawyer, politician, diplomat, best known as amateur naturalist
Mike Lischke, developer of GLScene
Wolfgang Lischke, German football player and coach

German-language surnames